The CEO is a 2016 Nigerian film directed by Kunle Afolayan, starring Kemi Lala Akindoju, Hilda Dokubo, Jimmy Jean-Louis, Angélique Kidjo and Wale Ojo. The film premiered at the Eko Hotels and Suites on July 10, 2016. The film was screened at the Toronto International Film Festival. The London premiere was held in October 2016 at Leicester Square Vue Cinema.

Cast 
Kemi Lala Akindoju as Lisa
Hilda Dokubo as Superintendent Ebenezer
Jimmy Jean-Louis as Jean-marc
Angélique Kidjo as Dr. Zara Zimmerman
Wale Ojo as Kola
Peter Nzioki as Jomo

Plot 
Five of the top members of a company are sent to a retreat and told one of them will become the new CEO. The cordial atmosphere quickly turns into a competition to see who can outdo all the others.

Reception 
Chioma Nwanna of BellaNaija praised the production, casting and location of the film. She noted in her review that the grammatical correctness in the dialogue by Tade Ogidan was top notch. She went further to say Wale Ojo and Nico Panagio playing "Kola Alabi" and Riikard Van Outen respectively was a highpoint in the character depictions of the film, but felt Kemi Lala role wasn't convincing. She also observed that Afolayan's use of many languages in his films gives a special impression. The trail of mystery murder was identified to shape most Afolayan's movie successfully but in this case Nwanna felt the story-line surrounding the deaths wasn't properly orchestrated. It concluded its review by saying "Okay, happy thoughts and positive vibes. It really was a good film. Just wish it cleaned up better.  But hey, I could give it a second watch and see how that works out."

Chidumga Izuzu of Pulse Nigeria captioned its review from the description that it was "... a serious film that does not offer the conventional entertainment that most viewers seek from Nollywood movies". It ended with a summary that "The CEO” might not be Afolayan's best work, but it is a highly engaging piece of work that grips your attention for a greater part of it, and has you guessing, asking lots of questions, thinking, and solving mysteries". YNaija described the lack of awards for the film at 2017 AMVCA as a welcome development and something "pleasant".

References

External links 
 

Nigerian drama films